San Lorenzo is a  department of Chaco Province in Argentina.

Settlements

Colonia Pozo Colorado
Samuhú
Villa Berthet

See also 
 Federal Capital

References

External links
El Diamante Chaqueño (Spanish)

Departments of Chaco Province